"Mean Woman Blues" is a rock and roll song written by Claude Demetrius. Elvis Presley recorded it for the soundtrack of the 1957 film, Loving You. In an album review for AllMusic, Bruce Eder described it as "some powerful rock & roll... which could almost have passed for one of his Sun tracks".

When the song was released for the jukebox market in September 1957, it reached number 11 on Billboard magazine's "Most Played in Jukeboxes" R&B chart.

Roy Orbison rendition

It peaked at number five on the Billboard Hot 100 singles chart.

References

Songs about blues
1957 songs
1957 singles
1963 singles
Songs written by Claude Demetrius
Elvis Presley songs
Jerry Lee Lewis songs
Roy Orbison songs
Monument Records singles
Song recordings produced by Fred Foster